František Getreuer (18 December 1906 – 6 February 1945) was a Czech national champion swimmer and Olympic water polo player. He was murdered in Dachau concentration camp.

Biography
Getreuer competed in the men's tournament at the 1928 Summer Olympics, coming in 9th with the Czechoslovak water polo team. 

He won the gold medal in the 400m freestyle in the Third Slavic Swimming Championship in Warsaw, Poland, in 1929. In the 1930 Czechoslovak Championship held, Getreuer won gold medals in the 200m freestyle, 400m freestyle, 1,500m freestyle, and 4x200-meter freestyle relay.

At the 1935 Maccabiah Games in Mandatory Palestine, Getreuer won gold medals in the 400m freestyle and the 1,500m freestyle, as well as a team gold meal in water polo.

Getreuer was Jewish. He lived in Prague, and was deported to Terezín concentration camp on 12 April 1941. He was later transported from Terezín to Auschwitz concentration camp on 28 September 1944. 

He was murdered on 6 February 1945, at 38 years of age, in Dachau concentration camp, in Bayern, Germany.

References

External links
 

1906 births
1945 deaths
Auschwitz concentration camp prisoners
Competitors at the 1935 Maccabiah Games
Czech male swimmers
Czech people who died in Dachau concentration camp
Czechoslovak Jews
Czechoslovak male water polo players
Jewish swimmers
Jewish water polo players
Maccabiah Games gold medalists
Maccabiah Games competitors by country
Maccabiah Games medalists in swimming
Olympic water polo players of Czechoslovakia
Sportspeople from Prague
Theresienstadt Ghetto prisoners
Water polo players at the 1928 Summer Olympics
Place of birth missing